Vasilevo is a municipality in the eastern part of North Macedonia. Vasilevo is also the name of the village where the municipal seat is found. Vasilevo Municipality is part of the Southeastern Statistical Region.

Demographics
According to the last national census from 2021, this municipality has 10,552 inhabitants. Ethnic groups in the municipality include:

The total number of students in the municipality in 2011, in comparison to the total number of students in 2007, increased for 4.4%. Vasilevo is the third municipality in North Macedonia by rise of the total number of students.

Vasilevo has a higher concentration of Catholics (Eastern) than most municipalities in North Macedonia, with the percentage of Catholic residents standing at 4.8% of the total populace in 2002 according to the census (581 Catholic residents out of 12122 total residents of the municipality). The majority of these Catholic residents, 520 of them, live in the town of Nova Maala, where, out of the total of 823 residents, they make up a majority of 63.2%, followed by the 232 Muslim residents (28.2%).

Localities 
 Nova Maala

References

External links
Official website

 
Southeastern Statistical Region
Municipalities of North Macedonia